The 1948 Minnesota Golden Gophers football team represented the University of Minnesota in the 1948 Big Nine Conference football season. In their 14th year under head coach Bernie Bierman, the Golden Gophers compiled a 7–2 record and outscored their opponents by a combined total of 203 to 94. 
 
Guard Leo Nomellini was named All-American by Walter Camp Football Foundation, Associated Press (AP), Collier's Weekly/Grantland Rice, The Sporting News, INS, Look Magazine, Football Writers Association of America and the American Football Coaches Association. Nomellini and end Bud Grant were also named All-Big Ten.

Halfback Ev Faunce was awarded the Team MVP Award.

Total attendance for the season was 308,556, which averaged to 61,711. The season high for attendance was against Purdue.

Schedule

Game summaries

Michigan

In week 5, Minnesota met Michigan in the annual Little Brown Jug game. The game was matched No. 1 Michigan against No. 13 Minnesota. Michigan won the game, 27–14. Despite being held to 22 rushing yards, Michigan gained 261 yards on forward passes. At the start of the second quarter, Gene Derricotte fumbled a punt on Michigan's 15-yard line, recovered the ball, ran backward to the two-yard line, and fumbled again. All-American Leo Nomellini recovered the ball and carried it into the end zone to give Minnesota a 7–0 lead. Michigan drove to the Minnesota one-yard line on the next drive, but Tom Peterson fumbled and Minnesota recovered the ball at the 16-yard line. Two drives later, Michigan finally converted on a seven-yard touchdown pass from Wally Teninga to Tom Peterson. Less than 90 seconds after Peterson's tying touchdown, Michigan took the lead when Ed McNeill blocked a Minnesota punt, and Quentin Sickels recovered the ball at the one-yard line. Peterson ran it in for his second touchdown. Minnesota drove to Michigan's one-yard line at the end of the second quarter, but the clock expired and Michigan led 13–7 at halftime.

Minnesota took a 14–13 lead in the third quarter on a 69-yard drive capped by a touchdown run by Everett Faunce. On the next possession, Michigan drove 77 yards and took a 20–14 lead on a 37-yard touchdown pass to Dick Rifenburg, who fumbled at the five-yard line, but the ball and continued into the endzone. In the fourth quarter, Wally Teninga intercepted a Bill Elliott pass on Michigan's 11-yard line and returned the ball 26 yards. Chuck Ortman connected with Leo Koceski on a jump pass that covered 62 yards (the last 50 by Koceski after the reception) to give Michigan its fourth touchdown. After watching Michigan's dominating performances over the best teams in the Big Nine Conference, Walter W. Ruch wrote in The New York Times that there could not be much doubt that "Oosterbaan has fashioned perhaps the finest team in the country."

References

Minnesota
Minnesota Golden Gophers football seasons
Minnesota Golden Gophers football